1972 in sports describes the year's events in world sport.

Alpine skiing
 Alpine Skiing World Cup
 Men's overall season champion: Gustav Thöni, Italy
 Women's overall season champion: Annemarie Pröll, Austria

American football
 16 January − Super Bowl VI: the Dallas Cowboys (NFC) won 24−3 over the Miami Dolphins (AFC)
 Location: Tulane Stadium
 Attendance: 81,023
 MVP: Roger Staubach, QB (Dallas)
 Orange Bowl (1971 season):
 The Nebraska Cornhuskers won 38–6 over the Alabama Crimson Tide to win the college football national championship
 23 December – In the first Pittsburgh Steelers playoff game in 25 years (and the franchises first playoff win), rookie Franco Harris salvages and converts into a touchdown a final seconds Terry Bradshaw incomplete pass in what has been called the greatest play in NFL history—The Immaculate Reception—to beat the Oakland Raiders 13–7.

Association football
 Brazil – Palmeiras wins the Campeonato Brasileiro
 England – FA Cup – Leeds United won 1–0 over Arsenal
 Europe – Cup Winners' Cup – Rangers F.C. won 3–2 over Dinamo Moscow
 West Germany beat the Soviet Union 3–0 to win the European Championship.

Athletics
 September – Athletics at the 1972 Summer Olympics held in Munich

Australian rules football
 Victorian Football League
 Carlton wins the 76th VFL Premiership (Carlton 28.9 (177) d Richmond 22.18 (150))
 Brownlow Medal awarded to Len Thompson (Collingwood)

Baseball

 The Washington Senators move to Dallas-Fort Worth, Texas to become the Texas Rangers.
 19 January – The BBWAA elects Sandy Koufax (344 votes), Yogi Berra (339), and Early Wynn (301) to the Hall of Fame.
 Sparky Lyle saves 35 games for the New York Yankees, breaking Ron Perranoski's 1970 records for AL pitchers and left-handers. Lyle also becomes the first left-hander to save 100 career games in the American League.
 World Series – Oakland Athletics win their first World Championship since the team was based in Philadelphia in 1930, and sixth in franchise history, by defeating the Cincinnati Reds, 4 games to 3.
 31 December – The Pittsburgh Pirates' legendary right fielder Roberto Clemente dies in a plane crash near Puerto Rico on his way to bring relief supplies to Nicaraguan earthquake victims.

Basketball
 NCAA Division I Men's Basketball Championship –
 UCLA wins 81–76 over Florida St.
 NBA Finals –
 Los Angeles Lakers won 4 games to 1 over the New York Knicks
 1972 ABA Finals –
 Indiana Pacers defeat New York Nets 4 games to 2

Boxing
 26 June – Roberto Durán stopped Ken Buchanan in the thirteenth round to win the WBA Lightweight Championship.

Canadian football
 Grey Cup – Hamilton Tiger-Cats won 13–10 over the Saskatchewan Roughriders
 Vanier Cup – Alberta Golden Bears won 20–7 over the Wilfrid Laurier Golden Hawks

Cycling
 Giro d'Italia won by Eddy Merckx of Belgium
 Tour de France – Eddy Merckx of Belgium
 UCI Road World Championships – Men's road race – Marino Basso of Italy

Disc sports
 Disc sports are introduced to Canada at the Canadian Open Frisbee Championships in Toronto

Field hockey
 Olympic Games (Men's Competition) in Munich, West Germany
 Gold Medal: West Germany
 Silver Medal: Pakistan
 Bronze Medal:

Figure skating
 World Figure Skating Championships –
 Men's champion: Ondrej Nepela, Czechoslovakia
 Ladies' champion: Trixi Schuba, Austria
 Pair skating champions: Irina Rodnina & Alexei Ulyanov, Soviet Union
 Ice dancing champions: Lyudmila Pakhomova & Alexandr Gorshkov, Soviet Union

Golf
Men's professional
 Masters Tournament – Jack Nicklaus
 U.S. Open – Jack Nicklaus
 British Open – Lee Trevino
 PGA Championship – Gary Player
 PGA Tour money leader – Jack Nicklaus – $320,542
 The European Tour begins its first season of competition.
Men's amateur
 British Amateur – Trevor Homer
 U.S. Amateur – Vinny Giles
Women's professional
 LPGA Championship – Kathy Ahern
 U.S. Women's Open – Susie Berning
 Titleholders Championship – Sandra Palmer
 LPGA Tour money leader – Kathy Whitworth – $65,063

Harness racing
 21 September – Strike Out became the first Canadian owned harness racing horse to ever win the Little Brown Jug.
 United States Pacing Triple Crown races –
 Cane Pace – Hilarious Way
 Little Brown Jug – Strike Out
 Messenger Stakes – Silent Majority
 Super Bowl wins the United States Trotting Triple Crown races –
 Hambletonian – Super Bowl
 Yonkers Trot – Super Bowl
 Kentucky Futurity – Super Bowl
 Australian Inter Dominion Harness Racing Championship –
 Pacers: Welcome Advice

Horse racing
Steeplechases
 Cheltenham Gold Cup – Glencaraig Lady
 Grand National – Well To Do
Flat races
 Australia – Melbourne Cup won by Piping Lane
 Canada – Queen's Plate won by Victoria Song
 France – Prix de l'Arc de Triomphe won by San San
 Ireland – Irish Derby Stakes won by Steel Pulse
 English Triple Crown Races:
 2,000 Guineas Stakes – High Top
 The Derby – Roberto
 St. Leger Stakes – Boucher
 United States Triple Crown Races:
 Kentucky Derby – Riva Ridge
 Preakness Stakes – Bee Bee Bee
 Belmont Stakes – Riva Ridge

Ice hockey
 18 March - NCAA Men's Ice Hockey Championship – Boston University Terriers defeat Cornell University Big Red 4–0 in Boston, Massachusetts
 22 April - Czechoslovakia defeats the Soviet Union to win the 1972 Ice Hockey World Championships.
 11 May - The Boston Bruins defeat the New York Rangers 3–0 to win the 1972 Stanley Cup Finals four games to two.
 14 May - The Cornwall Royals defeat the Peterborough Petes to win the 1972 Memorial Cup Canadian amateur ice hockey junior men's championship.
 15 May - The Spokane Jets defeat the Barrie Flyers 6–3 to win the 1972 Allan Cup Canadian amateur ice hockey senior men's championship.
 Art Ross Trophy as the NHL's leading scorer during the regular season: Phil Esposito, Boston Bruins
 Hart Memorial Trophy – for the NHL's Most Valuable Player: Bobby Orr, Boston Bruins
 28 September – Paul Henderson scored the "goal of the century" to give Canada the win in the Summit Series, the first ever Canada versus the Soviet Union challenge series.
 7 October - The National Hockey League begins the 1972–73 season.
  11 October - The World Hockey Association (WHA) professional league begins play in its first season. This new league signed several of the top NHL stars including Bobby Hull and Derek Sanderson.

Lacrosse
 The Long Branch P.C.O.'s win the first Founders Cup.
 The New Westminster Salmonbellies win the Mann Cup.
 The Peterborough PCO's win the Minto Cup.

Motorsport

Rugby league
1972 NSWRFL season
1972 New Zealand rugby league season
1971–72 Northern Rugby Football League season / 1972–73 Northern Rugby Football League season
1972 Rugby League World Cup

Rugby union
 78th Five Nations Championship series is undecided after two matches are not played for political reasons

Snooker
 World Snooker Championship – Alex Higgins beats John Spencer 37–32

Swimming
 XX Olympic Games, held in Munich, West Germany (28 August – 4 September)

Tennis
 Grand Slam in tennis men's results:
 Australian Open – Ken Rosewall
 French Open – Andrés Gimeno
 Wimbledon championships – Stan Smith
 U.S. Open – Ilie Năstase
 Grand Slam in tennis women's results:
 Australian Open – Virginia Wade
 French Open – Billie Jean King
 Wimbledon championships – Billie Jean King
 U.S. Open – Billie Jean King (first player in Open Era to repeat as singles champion)
 Davis Cup – United States wins 3–2 over Romania in world tennis.

General sporting events
 1972 Summer Olympics takes place in Munich, Germany
 USSR wins the most medals (99), and the most gold medals (50)
 1972 Winter Olympics takes place in Sapporo, Japan
 USSR wins the most medals (16), and the most gold medals (8)
 Seventh Winter Universiade held in Lake Placid, New York, United States

Awards
 Associated Press Male Athlete of the Year – Mark Spitz, Swimming
 Associated Press Female Athlete of the Year – Olga Korbut, Gymnastics

References

 
Sports by year